Martin Regborn (born 10 December 1992) is a Swedish orienteer. He won a gold medal in the long distance event at the 2022 European Orienteering Championships in Rakvere, Estonia.

Regborn won a bronze medal in the long distance at the 2016 European Orienteering Championships in Jeseník, Czech Republic. At the 2017 World Orienteering Championships in Tartu, Estonia, he placed ninth in the long distance, and seventh in the sprint final.

References

External links
 
 Martin Regborn at World of O Runners

1992 births
Living people
Swedish orienteers
Foot orienteers
Competitors at the 2017 World Games
Competitors at the 2022 World Games
World Games medalists in orienteering
World Games silver medalists
World Games bronze medalists